Idotea neglecta is a marine isopod in the family Idoteidae. It can be found on algae in the littoral and sublittoral zone of north-west European coasts.

Distribution 
I. neglecta can be found on all north-west European coasts.

Description 
Male I. neglecta measure , females . They are brownish, sometimes with white longitudinal lateral markings or white marbling over the dorsal surface. The pleotelson of adults has straight sides converging posteriorly.

References 

Valvifera
Crustaceans of the Atlantic Ocean
Taxa named by Georg Ossian Sars
Crustaceans described in 1897